The 1900 Cincinnati Reds season was a season in American baseball. The team finished seventh in the National League with a record of 62–77, 21.5 games behind the Brooklyn Superbas.

Regular season 
After a disappointing sixth-place finish in 1899, the Reds began to rebuild for the future in 1900.  Manager Buck Ewing was replaced after leading the Reds for five seasons, in which the team had a 394–297 record. However, they never finished above third place in the National League during Ewing's tenure. The team named Bob Allen as manager.  Allen was a player-manager for the Philadelphia Phillies for their last thirty-five games in 1890, in which the team went 25–10.  He last played in the National League in 1897 with the Boston Beaneaters, and played for the Phillies between 1890–1894.

During the off-season, the Reds' longtime second baseman, Bid McPhee, retired from playing.  McPhee played with the Reds since their inception in 1882, and in his hall of fame career, he batted .272 with 53 home runs and 1072 RBI while scoring 1684 runs with 2258 hits.  McPhee led the American Association in home runs in 1886 with eight, and in triples in 1887 with nineteen.  To replace McPhee, the Reds moved third baseman Harry Steinfeldt over to second before they acquired Joe Quinn in the early part of the 1900 season.

The team acquired pitchers Ed Scott and Doc Newton from the Indianapolis Hoosiers of the Western League. Neither the 29-year-old Scott nor the 22-year-old Newton had any major league experience.

Offensively, Jake Beckley once again proved to be the leader, as he hit a team high .341 with two home runs and 94 RBI.  Jimmy Barrett had a breakout season, batting .316 with five home runs and 42 RBI, while having the team lead in runs with 114 and stolen bases with 44.  Sam Crawford, in his first season as a regular, hit .260 with a team high seven home runs and drove in 59 runs.

Scott led the pitching staff with 17 wins, 31 complete games and 315 innings pitched in 42 games.  Noodles Hahn finished just behind Scott in wins with 16, while he had a team best 3.20 ERA in 39 games.  Hahn led the league with four shutouts, and 132 strikeouts.

Season summary 
The Reds started off the year on a good note, going 6–3 in their first nine games to sit in a first place tie with the Philadelphia Phillies.  That would be the high point of the season, as Cincinnati would eventually going into a 3–18 slump to completely fall out of the pennant race and well below the .500 level.  Wins would be scarce for the Reds, as they finished the year with a 62–77 record, which placed them in seventh place in the eight team National League, 21.5 games behind the Brooklyn Superbas.

On July 5–6, 1900, the Reds only had one hit each in consecutive games at League Park against the Superbas. Jerry Nops threw the one-hitter on July 5, while Frank Kitson tossed the second one-hitter the next day. The Reds would not endure such a feat until April 25–26, 2013 against the Washington Nationals. On July 12, Hahn threw a no-hitter against the Phillies.

Season standings

Record vs. opponents

Roster

Player stats

Batting

Starters by position 
Note: Pos = Position; G = Games played; AB = At bats; H = Hits; Avg. = Batting average; HR = Home runs; RBI = Runs batted in

Other batters 
Note: G = Games played; AB = At bats; H = Hits; Avg. = Batting average; HR = Home runs; RBI = Runs batted in

Pitching

Starting pitchers 
Note: G = Games pitched; IP = Innings pitched; W = Wins; L = Losses; ERA = Earned run average; SO = Strikeouts

Other pitchers 
Note: G = Games pitched; IP = Innings pitched; W = Wins; L = Losses; ERA = Earned run average; SO = Strikeouts

References

External links
1900 Cincinnati Reds season at Baseball Reference

Cincinnati Reds seasons
Cincinnati Reds season
Cincinnati Reds